São Pedro de Alcântara was a Franciscan monastery in the Bairro Alto district of Lisbon, founded in the late 17th century. It is a large Baroque building, with a highly decorated chapel.

The monastery was established by António Luís de Meneses, who promised to built the monastery if he prevailed in the Battle of Montes Claros. When the religious orders, convents, and monasteries in Portugal were closed by the government in 1833, the monastery buildings were handed over to the Santa Casa da Misericórdia de Lisboa (a society charged with helping the old, the sick, and abandoned or orphaned children). 

At present the Santa Casa uses the buildings as a home for young girls.

Location/address 
Rua de São Pedro de Alcântara at Rua Luisa Todi in Lisbon.

Instituto São Pedro de Alcântara
Rua Luisa Todi, 1
1200-245 Lisbon

References 

Franciscan monasteries in Portugal
Monastery Sao Pedro Alcantara
History of Lisbon
Christian monasteries in Portugal
Christianity in Lisbon